Dr Subhash Gupta is the chief of liver transplantation, a hepato-pancreato-biliary surgeon, and the chairman of the Max Center of Liver and Biliary Sciences at Max Healthcare, Saket.

Professional career
Dr. Gupta is accredited all over the world for his leading work in liver transplantation in the Indian subcontinent. He and his team successfully conducted over 2500 liver transplants in 15 years,  of which 300 in 2013

Dr. Gupta joined Sir Ganga Ram Hospital in 1998 and set up liver transplantation there along with Dr. Shantanu Nundy. The department conducted the first liver transplant in 2001—a deceased donor liver transplant. Along with Dr. S. Nundy, he began performing living donor liver transplantations as the predominant form of liver transplantation. After a slow start, the liver transplantation program took off with 66 transplants in 2006. He pioneered the development of living donor liver transplantations in India. Previously, patients had to travel abroad to get this treatment, at a very high cost. His surgical techniques have brought costs down to a fraction of what is charged elsewhere, making liver transplants available to patients from India, Africa, the Middle East and the Far East

Founder of Centre for Liver & Biliary Sciences
Dr. Gupta is the owner and president of the Centre for Liver and Biliary Sciences. In 2013, the team helped other centers within India and abroad to set up liver transplantation. The team helped hospitals in Pakistan, Bangladesh, and Kazakhstan. Surgical procedures are complemented by an advanced intervention radiology setup that deals with procedures such as channelization, radiofrequency ablation and percutaneous alcohol injection into tumor tissue.

The unit has treated patients from all over India as well as patients from the Middle East, Africa, and Southeast Asia. Apart from malignancies, this unit has considerable skills in dealing with surgical management of all aspects of pancreatitis. Its faculty consists of nationally and internationally known consultants.

Academic career
Dr. Subhash Gupta completed his undergraduate degree and masters in General surgery from All India Institute of Medical Sciences, New Delhi. He specialized in surgical gastroenterology in 1989. In 1993, he moved to England to work and train under Dr. Paul McMaster in the Liver unit at Queen Elizabeth hospital in Birmingham.

In February 1995, he moved to the Department of Organ Transplantation at St James's University Hospital in Leeds, where he worked later as a locum consultant.

During his stay in UK, Dr Gupta qualified for Fellowship of the Royal College of Surgeons of Edinburgh and of Glasgow. He has published extensively on different aspects of living donor liver transplantations such as liver transplantation without hepatitis B immunoglobulin prophylaxis and appropriate cytomegalovirus prophylaxis.

He is an Associate Professor in Surgery from the University of Queensland, Australia. The Institute of Post Graduate Education and Medical Research in Kolkata honored him with the position of Professor of Liver Transplantation. He delivered the annual oration In JIPMER Scientific Society in Puducherry in 2011 and is a recipient of a Gold Medal by the Delhi Medical Association in 2005. He is also on the Board of Management of Mahatma Gandhi Medical College, Mumbai as a central government nominee.

With the help of the Federation of Indian Chambers of Commerce & Industry (FICCI) and the Ministry of Health, he led the team to develop standard guidelines for the treatment of liver diseases and liver transplantation in India. This work helped lay down the criteria for the correct management of chronic liver disease and acute liver failure and will help in deciding insurance-related claims.

Achievements 

 October 2021 - Successfully reused a transplanted liver for the first time in India.
 February 2021 - Performed a surgical marathon, involving 7 operation theaters, 2 donors & 4 patients in a 25 hours.
 March 2019 - Performed the first liver transplant at King George's Medical University since 100 years of establishment.

Awards 
National Talent Scholarship: NCERT, Government of India, 1978
Associate Professor, University of Queensland, Australia, 2008
Professor of Liver Transplantation, Institute of Post Graduate Medical Education and Research, Kolkata, 2010
Delhi Medical Council, gold medal, 2005
Rotary Club: Distinguished Clinician Award, 2011
Delhi Medical Council: Vishist Chikitsak Rattan, 2012
Nominee: central government, MGM Medical College
Dr. BC Roy Memorial Award, Medical Council Of India

Publications and lectures
He has published over 100 papers on surgery and transplantation, along with significant contributions to numerous books in his field. He has focused his clinical and research activities towards the medical management of patients with liver diseases. Publications include:

References

Indian surgeons
1962 births
Living people
Indian medical writers